EC Bad Tölz is an ice hockey team in Bad Tölz, Germany. They play in the Oberliga, the third level of German ice hockey.

History
The club was founded in 1928. They won the Ice hockey Bundesliga twice in the 1960s. In 2005, Bad Tölz was relegated to the Oberliga. In 2017 they lost the Oberliga play-off-finals 3-1 against Dutch side Tilburg Trappers (playing in the Oberliga Nord), but they were allowed to promote to the DEL2 as Tilburg Trappers could not be promoted as they are a Dutch team.

Achievements
1.Bundesliga champion: 1962, 1966.
2.Bundesliga champion: 1987, 1989, 1990, 1997.
Oberliga champion: 1994, 2012.
Oberliga Süd champion 2016.

External links
  Official site

Ice hockey teams in Germany
Ice hockey clubs established in 1928
Ice hockey teams in Bavaria
Bad Tölz-Wolfratshausen
1928 establishments in Germany